The Warren Times-Gazette is a weekly newspaper in Bristol County, Rhode Island covering local news, sports, business and community events. It is owned by East Bay Newspapers and has a paid circulation of 2,834 readers.

The Warren Gazette was established in 1866 by retired sea captain James W. Barton who had experience working in the printing office of the Providence American before he became a shipmaster. Henry H. Luther was the first editor of the paper; he was succeeded by George H. Coomer, a locally known writer and poet. Coomer's work is showcased in the Charles Whipple Greene Museum in Rhode Island.

References

External links 
 Warren Times-Gazette website
 East Bay Newspapers Twitter

List of newspapers in Rhode Island

Newspapers published in Rhode Island